The 2010 Michelin Ginetta G50 Cup was the third Ginetta G50 Cup. The season began at Thruxton on 4 April and finished after 28 races over 10 rounds at Brands Hatch on 10 October, supporting rounds of the British Touring Car Championship.

Despite scoring 38 fewer points overall than title rival Carl Breeze, it was Dynojet's Frank Wrathall who became champion after a successful season in which he took five overall victories, as well as taking six other class victories in which he was the first championship-registered finisher. Ten points behind on dropped scores was Total Control Racing's Breeze, an improvement on his third place championship finish behind Nathan Freke and Wrathall in 2009. Breeze took nine overall victories, but championship hopes were thwarted by 40 penalty points picked up during the season. Third place went to Century Motorsport's Benji Hetherington, who took two overall victories and two other victories, with double Croft winner Tom Sharp (IDL) and the second Century Motorsport car of Benji's brother, Freddie Hetherington, who finished on the podium twice.

Outside the top five, Wrathall's Dynojet team-mate Adam Morgan took the other overall victory to be claimed during the season – at Croft – while Matt Bell took a class win at Thruxton for United Autosports. Nine wins were taken by guest drivers during the season; Nigel Moore claimed five victories in eleven starts for Tockwith, Jonathan Adam won a race at his home circuit of Knockhill in the Ginetta Cars entry, denoted as the "guest car", while Rob Huff took a hat-trick of victories at the opening round at Thruxton when the guest car was run by Dynojet for one event only.

Teams and drivers

Calendar
The series was contested over 28 races held at 10 rounds and supported the British Touring Car Championship at all rounds. All rounds were held in the United Kingdom.

Championship standings

References

External links
 Official website

Ginetta G50